The men's 20 kilometres walk event at the 2001 Summer Universiade was held in Beijing, China on 29 August.

Results

References

Athletics at the 2001 Summer Universiade
2001